Benjamín Domínguez (born 19 September 2003) is a Argentine professional footballer who plays for Gimnasia La Plata.

Club career 
Benjamín Domínguez came through the youth ranks of Club de Gimnasia y Esgrima in his native La Plata, being promoted to the first team towards the end of the 2021 season. He made his professional debut for Gimnasia on the 23 November 2021, coming on as a late substitute for Luis Rodríguez during the 5–2 home Superliga win against Talleres de Córdoba, that took the league title out of their opponents hands, with River Plate being crowned Argentine champions in the next days.

References

External links

2003 births
Living people
Argentine footballers
Argentina youth international footballers
Association football forwards
Footballers from La Plata
Club de Gimnasia y Esgrima La Plata footballers
Argentine Primera División players